William Madison Furnish (born August 17, 1912, in Tipton, Iowa, died November 9, 2007) was an American paleontologist. He taught at the University of Iowa. 

In 1938, he described the conodont genus Acanthodus from the Prairie du Chien (Lower Ordovician) beds of the upper Mississippi valley.

In 1964, with Carl B. Rexroad, he described the conodont genus Hindeodus  from the Pella Formation (Mississippian) of South-Central Iowa.

Awards and tributes 
He received the Pander Medal, awarded by the Pander Society, an informal organisation founded in 1967 for the promotion of the study of conodont palaeontology.

The conodont genus name Furnishina Müller 1959 is a tribute to WM Furnish.

References

External links
 William Madison Furnish at University of Iowa website (retrieved 18 June 2016)

American paleontologists
Conodont specialists
1912 births
2007 deaths
People from Tipton, Iowa
University of Iowa faculty
20th-century American zoologists